The majority and minority leaders of the House of Representatives of Puerto Rico are two Puerto Rican Representatives who are elected by the party conferences that hold the majority and the minority respectively. These leaders serve as the chief House spokespeople for their parties and manage and schedule the legislative and executive business of the House. By rule, the Presiding Officer gives the Majority Leader priority in obtaining recognition to speak on the floor of the House.

Majority leaders

Minority leaders

Assistant party leaders

Majority Whips
 2013–2013: Eduardo Ferrer
 2013–2017: Carlos Bianchi Angleró
2017–present: Urayoán Hernández

Minority Whips
 2013–2016: Johnny Méndez
 2016-2021: Ramón Luis Cruz
 2021-Present: Gabriel Rodríguez Aguiló

Officers of the House of Representatives of Puerto Rico
P